A nemeton (plural: nemeta) was a sacred space of ancient Celtic religion. Nemeta appear to have been primarily situated in natural areas, and, as they often utilized trees, they are often interpreted as sacred groves. However, other evidence suggests that the word implied a wider variety of ritual spaces, such as shrines and temples. Evidence for nemeta consists chiefly of inscriptions and toponymy or place-names, which occur all across the Celtic world. Toponyms related to the word nemeton occur as far west as Galicia in the Iberian peninsula, as far north as Scotland, and as far east as central Turkey. The word is related to the name of the Nemetes tribe living by the Rhine between the Palatinate and Lake Constance in what is now Germany, and their goddess Nemetona.

Contemporary description
Pliny and Lucan wrote that druids did not meet in stone temples or other constructions, but in sacred groves of trees. In his Pharsalia Lucan described such a grove near Massilia in dramatic terms more designed to evoke horror among his Roman hearers than meant as proper natural history:

no bird nested in the nemeton, nor did any animal lurk nearby; the leaves constantly shivered though no breeze stirred. Altars stood in its midst, and the images of the gods. Every tree was stained with sacrificial blood. the very earth groaned, dead yews revived; unconsumed trees were surrounded with flame, and huge serpents twined round the oaks. The people feared to approach the grove, and even the priest would not walk there at midday or midnight lest he should then meet its divine guardian.

Tacitus, son in law of a Roman officer who was probably an eyewitness of the first Roman invasion of Anglesey, reports that when the Romans landed

On the shore stood the opposing army with its dense array of armed warriors, while between the ranks dashed women, in black attire like the Furies, with hair dishevelled, waving brands. All around, the Druids, lifting up their hands to heaven, and pouring forth dreadful imprecations, scared our soldiers by the unfamiliar sight, so that, as if their limbs were paralysed, they stood motionless, and exposed to wounds. Then urged by their general's appeals and mutual encouragements not to quail before a troop of frenzied women, they bore the standards onwards, smote down all resistance, and wrapped the foe in the flames of his own brands. A force was next set over the conquered, and their groves, devoted to inhuman superstitions, were destroyed. They deemed it indeed a duty to cover their altars with the blood of captives and to consult their deities through human entrails.

Examples
Descriptions of such sites have been found all across the Celtic world. Attested examples include Nemetobriga near Ourense in northwestern Spain, Drunemeton in Galatia, at Medionemeton near the Antonine Wall in Scotland and in mid-Devon there are at least ten Nymet and Nymph place-names in the area surrounding the village of Bow.

 Mars Lucetius ("Shining Mars") and Nemetona appear as a divine couple in Roman-era inscriptions. At the Romano-British site in Bath, a dedication was made to Mars Loucetius and Nemetona by a pilgrim who had come from the continental Treveri of Gallia Belgica to seek healing. A Mars Rigonemetis ("Mars, King of the Sacred Grove") appears in the context of Roman Imperial cult in a dedication discovered at Nettleham (Lincolnshire) in 1961. He may have been a god belonging to the tribe of the Corieltauvi.
 A nemeton is in the Roman placename Vernemeton (now Willoughby-on-the-Wolds, Nottinghamshire), in Roman Aquae Arnemetiae (now Buxton, Derbyshire), and in the 1194 reference to Nametwihc, "Sanctuary-Town," (Nantwich, Cheshire).
In Scotland, nemeton place-names are quite frequent, as they are in Devon, where they appear in numerous place-names containing Nymet or Nympton, and have been identified with the name Nemetotatio in the Ravenna Cosmography near the site of modern-day North Tawton.
A well known nemeton site is in the Névet forest near Locronan in Brittany (cf. Modern Breton neved 'sanctuary', Welsh nyfed). Gournay-sur-Aronde, in the Oise department of France, also houses the remains of a nemeton. Echoes of the word nemeton survive in many French place-names such as Novionemetum (noviios 'new') that evolved to Nonant, Nonant-le-Pin, etc., *Nemeto-pons, with Latin pons 'bridge' : Nampont and Nemetodurum 'door' or 'forum of the temple' : Nanterre. In Paris, a case has been made for "Namet" in a line of doggerel of about 1270, as the ancient name for the Quartier du Temple on the Right Bank.
In Ireland, there was a chapel Nemed at Armagh and another on Sliabh Fhuait.
Nemetons also existed as far east as the Gaulish region of Galatia in Anatolia, where Strabo records the name of the meeting-place of the council of the Galatians as Drunemeton.
 A nemeton had been identified at Matabodes, near the city of Beja (South of Portugal).

See also
 Lucus and nemus, ancient Roman equivalents
 The Irish mythological figure Nemed

Notes

References

 T. D. Kendrick, The Druids. Merchant Book Company Limited. 1994. 

 Carlo di Simone, Celtico Nemeto- "Bosco Sacro" ed i suoi Derivati Onomastici. In: "Navicula Tubingensis: studia in honorem Antonii Tovar, by Francisco J. Oroz Arizcuren, Antonio Tovar, Eugenio Coseriu, Carlo De Simone; Tübinger Beiträge zur Linguistik, 230. Tübingen, 1984. , . (google books)

External links
 Mary Jones, Celtic Encyclopedia: nemeton Instances in Roman inscriptions.

Ancient Celtic religion
Druidry
Trees in mythology
Sacred natural sites